Pilot Township is a township in Vermilion County, Illinois, USA.  As of the 2010 census, its population was 587 and it contained 257 housing units.

History
Pilot Township was one of the eight townships created in 1851.

Geography

Unincorporated towns
 Collison

Extinct towns
 Hope

Adjacent townships
 Middlefork Township (north)
 Blount Township (east)
 Oakwood Township (south)
 Ogden Township, Champaign County (southwest)
 Compromise Township, Champaign County (west)

Cemeteries
The township contains eight cemeteries: Collison, Concord, Emberry Chaple, Knight's Branch, Rice, Stump, Trimmell and Underwood Family.

Major highways
  Illinois State Route 49

Airports and landing strips
 Collison Airport

Demographics

References
 U.S. Board on Geographic Names (GNIS)
 United States Census Bureau cartographic boundary files

External links
 US-Counties.com
 City-Data.com
 Illinois State Archives

Townships in Vermilion County, Illinois
Townships in Illinois